The Niels Wessel Bagge Art Foundation (Danish: Niels Wessel Bagges Kunstfond) is a non-profit organization founded by the Danish dancer, scenographer and art collector Niels Wessel Bagge. Items from Bagge's own art and crafts collection are now on display in four Danish art museums. Each year, the foundation awards five to 10 grants to Danish artists.

History
Niels Wessel Bagge was born into a wealthy family in Copenhagen. He later moved to America where he had a career in showbiz. He established the foundation in the United States through his will in 1994 and selected the businessman Ebbe Wedell-Wedell as its first chairman. The foundation is now based in Copenhagen, Denmark.

Management
The foundation is administrated by a board consisting of Nina Wedell-Wedellsborg (chairman), lawyer Christian Alsøe, IT entrepreneur Juri Krasilnikoff and artist Lulu Refn.

Grants

2000s

2010s

References

External links
 Official website

Foundations based in Denmark
Arts in Denmark
1994 establishments in Denmark
Danish awards